Behemoth is an extinct ammonite cephalopod genus within the family Dorsoplanitidae, that lived during the upper Tithonian stage of Late Jurassic Europe and Greenland.

Description
Behemoth ammonites grew fairly large, with a shell diameter over one meter in the type species, B. lapideus.

References

Late Jurassic ammonites of Europe
Tithonian first appearances
Tithonian life
Perisphinctoidea
Ammonitida genera